Marta Marie Nielsen  (26 March 1881 – 15 June 1948 ) was a Norwegian schoolteacher and politician.

She was born in Christiania to Christian Nielsen and Anne Bønsnæs. She was elected representative to the Storting for the period 1937–1945, for the Labour Party.

References

1881 births
1948 deaths
Politicians from Oslo
Labour Party (Norway) politicians
Members of the Storting
Norwegian schoolteachers
Women members of the Storting